Can I Pet Your Dog? (CIPYD) is a weekly, comedic podcast on dogs that was first released in 2015. The podcast is hosted by Allegra Ringo (Episodes 1-188), Alexis B. Preston (189-present), Renee Colvert, and produced by Travis McElroy (episodes 1–57) and Alexis B. Preston (episodes 58–present). It is distributed online by Maximum Fun.

Format 
The format of each episode is divided between segments discussed by the hosts and their guests. Segments include "hero dogs" and "dog tech." Originally, the show featured a segment called "Mutt Minute" wherein a host is assigned the task of educating the audience on a dog breed in under a minute. Starting in episode 143, this segment is replaced with "My Mutt Minute", where listeners submit a one-minute voice recording about their own dogs.

Guests 
Guests have included Veronica Belmont, Julie Ann Emery, Lesli Margherita, Lin-Manuel Miranda, John Roberts, Alison Rosen, Jesse Thorn, Noël Wells, and Anne Wheaton.

Episodes

Reception 
Splitsiders Elizabeth Stamp reviewed the first episode favorably stating "If you love comedy and cute dogs, there's finally a podcast to satisfy both your interests." The Forum of Fargo-Moorheads Dr. Susan Mathison called Can I Pet Your Dog? "a burst of pure delight" and "too cute".

References

External links 
 

Audio podcasts
Comedy and humor podcasts
2015 podcast debuts
Maximum Fun
American podcasts